The Great Writers series was a collection of literary biographies published in London from 1887, by Walter Scott & Co. The founding editor was Eric Sutherland Robertson, followed by Frank T. Marzials.

The stated intention, articulated by Robertson, was that the series should constitute fact-based textbooks of English literature. He advocated analytical and scholarly methods of literary study. The works generally contained a bibliography, compiled by John Parker Anderson of the British Museum.

A comparable French series also began publication in 1887, edited by Jean Jules Jusserand, under the title Les Grands Écrivains Français. Its inspiration was John Morley's English Men of Letters, published from 1880. Oscar Wilde called the Great Writers series "unfortunate", but suggested that Anderson's bibliographies were of value, and should be collected up. His dislike of the restrictions on authors extended also to the English Men of Letters. Other series in imitation of English Men of Letters were English Worthies (Longman) and Literary Lives (Hodder).

Notes

Book series introduced in 1887
Biographies about writers
Series of books